This is the discography for American pop singer Tiffany Darwish, known mononymously as Tiffany, who scored five US top 40 hits in the late 1980s, which included "I Think We're Alone Now" and "Could've Been", both of which reached number one on the US Billboard Hot 100.

Albums

Studio albums

Compilation albums

Extended plays

Singles

Footnotes
 1 Released in Asia only.

Music videos

References

Discographies of American artists
Pop music discographies